Glenn Alan Medeiros (born June 24, 1970) is an American former musician, singer, and songwriter who achieved chart success in the late 1980s and early 1990s.  He is best known on the national and international music scene for his 1987 global smash, "Nothing's Gonna Change My Love for You", and "She Ain't Worth It", a US chart-topper in 1990. He has remained regularly involved in the music industry in his home state of Hawaii (including several headliner and related musical variety shows in Waikiki) long after achieving global success decades ago.

After his musical career peaked, Medeiros taught and was vice-principal at the Maryknoll School, a parochial school in Honolulu, Hawaii, and as a professor at Chaminade University, a private Marianist university which shares its grounds with Saint Louis School. On July 1, 2015, Medeiros became the Head of School/Principal of Saint Louis School in Honolulu, and in 2017 its president/CEO.

Early life and education
Medeiros was born in Lihue, Hawaii and raised in Lawai. He's of Portuguese descent.

Medeiros attended Leeward Community College and transferred to University of Hawaiʻi – West Oʻahu, where he received his bachelor's degree. He graduated from the University of Phoenix-Hawaii with an MA in elementary education.

In 2014, Medeiros received a doctorate degree in educational leadership from the University of Southern California.

Career

Music
Medeiros began his musical career at the age of 10 when he helped his father entertain guests on his tour bus on the island of Kauai.

In 1986, at the age of 16, Medeiros won Brown Bags to Stardom, a local radio talent contest in Hawaii, when he performed a cover version of George Benson's "Nothing's Gonna Change My Love for You" which was subsequently produced into an album by a small local independent label. A visiting radio executive, Guy Zapoleon, from KZZP in Phoenix, Arizona heard the song and took the record back to Phoenix, where, through word of mouth, it became a national hit. Later, a worldwide hit, it reached #12 on the Billboard Hot 100 and spent four weeks at number one on the UK Singles Chart in July 1988.  It reached #3 on Billboard's Adult Contemporary chart.

In 1988, he recorded the single "Un roman d'amitié (Friend You Give Me a Reason)", a duet in French and English with Elsa Lunghini that reached #1 in France for three weeks. He also achieved a 1990 United States #1 hit duet with Bobby Brown titled "She Ain't Worth It". The same track peaked at #12 in the UK Singles Chart. He had another hit duet with Ray Parker Jr. titled "All I'm Missing Is You" which peaked at #32 in the US.

In 1989, Medeiros recorded "Under Any Moon" with The Jets, which was included on the soundtrack of The Karate Kid Part III in which he made an appearance in the movie singing. In 1991, Medeiros did a song called "If Looks Could Kill (No Turning Back)" for the spy action/comedy film If Looks Could Kill starring Richard Grieco, which is the title song of the movie on the soundtrack. In 1992 Medeiros recorded a duet with Thomas Anders (of Modern Talking fame) titled "Standing Alone" and shot a video.

Medeiros wrote "Break These Walls" for the New Zealand singer Sam Verlinden. He also wrote the song "Follow the Sun" for Regine Velasquez, which was later recorded by the group Forte. In addition, Medeiros wrote the song entitled "These Tears I Cry" for Martin Nievera. Medeiros has written nearly two hundred songs, many of which have been recorded by various artists throughout the world.

Medeiros is the host and performer at the Hale Koa Hotel's luau in Waikiki. He also headlined in Waikiki for many years with Frank Delima.

Education
Medeiros was the vice principal of Maryknoll Grade School and then its high school. He taught at various schools throughout Oahu, including Mililani Middle School, St. Joseph School in Waipahu, and Island Pacific Academy in Kapolei.

On July 1, 2015, Medeiros was appointed Head of School/Principal of St. Louis School, an all boys Catholic (Marianist Order) school (K-12) in Honolulu Oahu, where he has been its president/CEO since 2017.

Personal life
Medeiros is of Portuguese ancestry. He and his wife, Tammy, have been married since 1996. They have a son, Chord, and a daughter, Lyric, who appeared on Season 21 of American Idol.

Discography

Albums

Studio albums

Singles

References

External links
Glenn Medeiros & Thomas Anders

1970 births
Living people
21st-century American singers
21st-century American male singers
American people of Portuguese descent
Schoolteachers from Hawaii
Singers from Hawaii
Songwriters from Hawaii
USC Rossier School of Education alumni
American male songwriters
People from Kauai County, Hawaii
People from Lihue, Hawaii
Leeward Community College alumni
University of Hawaiʻi – West Oʻahu alumni